712 Naval Air Squadron (712 NAS) was a Naval Air Squadron of the Royal Navy's Fleet Air Arm.

It was initially established as a flight in 1936 before being upgraded to squadron status in 1938.

In 1944-45 it operated as a communications squadron from RNAS Hatston.

Notes

References 

700 series Fleet Air Arm squadrons
Military units and formations established in 1938
Air squadrons of the Royal Navy in World War II